Tewa Kiram (born 21 March 1992) also known as Teerachai Sithmorseng (ถิรชัย ศิษย์หมอเส็ง), Teerachai Kratingdaenggym (ถิรชัย กระทิงแดงยิม) or Teerachai Or Ekarin (ถิรชัย อ.เอกรินทร์), is a professional welterweight boxer. Kiram peaked at #1 ranked in World Boxing Association (WBA) as of January 2017.

Boxing career
He made his professional boxing debut by defeating fellow Thai boxer Manfa Luksaikongdin, a former Pan Asian Boxing Association (PABA) light welterweight champion on points over six rounds in early 2008.

In 2011 and 2013, he traveled to the United States as a sparring partner for star Manny Pacquiao.

On February 17, 2017, he beat Vijender Kumar from Indonesia by ninth-round technical knockout at Morseng Thailand Building, Nham Daeng Market, Samut Prakan province.

Challenging for the WBA welterweight title
On January 20, 2018, he fought against and lost via 8th-round KO to Lucas Matthysse from Argentina for the vacant WBA Welterweight world championship in California, United States in a fight organized by Oscar De La Hoya's Golden Boy Promotions. During that time, he trained with former WBC champion Sirimongkol Singwangcha and Olympic medalist Suriya Prasathinphimai.

Super welterweight and Light heavyweight
Following his unsuccessful bid for the world title, Teerachai moved up to super welterweight and returned to fighting regularly in Thailand. On September 7, 2019, he defeated Junjesie Igbos by second-round knockout to win the WBA Asia super welterweight championship. He retained the title against Salehe Mkalekwa by unanimous decision on November 1, 2019.

On December 19, 2020, he defeated Chaloemporn Singwancha by tenth-round KO to win the WBA Asia light heavyweight championship. He would make his next title defense against former world champion Sirimongkol Singwancha on April 24, 2021, retaining the WBA Asia light heavyweight title by sixth-round technical knockout after Sirimongkol failed to come out for the seventh round.

He eventually moved back to super welterweight and defeated Mohammed Zamani to reclaim the WBA  Asia super welterweight championship on July 2, 2022.

Professional Boxing Titles
World Boxing Association
Pan Asian Boxing Association Welterweight interim title (2010)
Pan Asian Boxing Association Welterweight title (2012)
Pan Asian Boxing Association Welterweight Super title (2013)
WBA Asia Welterweight title (2017)
WBA Asia Super welterweight title (2019) 
WBA Asia Light heavyweight title (2020) 
WBA Asia Super welterweight title (2022) 
World Boxing Society
Pan Asian Boxing Association Welterweight title (2017)

Professional boxing record

References

External links
 

1992 births
Living people
Teerachai Sithmorseng
Welterweight boxers
Teerachai Sithmorseng